Mickleham is a suburb of Melbourne, Victoria, Australia, 29 km (18 mi) north of Melbourne's central business district, located within the City of Hume local government area and beyond the Urban Growth Boundary. Mickleham recorded a population of 17,452 at the 2021 census, compared to 3,142 at the 2016 census. In 2018, it was covered by the Australian Broadcasting Corporation as Australia's fastest-growing suburb.

The number of dwellings in Mickleham is forecast to grow from 1,090 in 2016 to 8,221 in 2026 with an estimated population of 14,210.

Mickleham is located north of Yuroke, on Mickleham Road.

History
Mickleham Post Office opened on 1 February 1862 and closed in 1967. To the west of the locality a Konagaderrer office opened in 1913 as settlement took place along Deep Creek but closed in 1920. This area is now known as Konagaderra Springs.

Today
Currently there are 7 estates under development in Mickleham with plans of housing, schools, child care, huge city centre and a business park on Donnybrook Road between Mickleham Road and Hume Fwy. These estates are 
Trijena,
Botanical,
Merrifield, The Woods, Annadale, Waratah and already developed Trillium.

Mickleham has a primary school which is located at the corner of Mickleham Road and Mount Ridley Road. Next to the primary school is the community centre and tennis courts.

Mickleham also has a P-12 grammar school on Mount Ridley Road named Hume Anglican Grammar School. It is co-educational and features two basketball/tennis courts, a soccer pitch and an Australian rules football ground.

Mickleham also has an Islamic school named Darul Ulum Academy, that will be open for primary level education in 2022 and secondary level education in the future. It is a campus of the biggest Islamic school in Victoria, the Darul Ulum College of Victoria.

The town also hosts Mickleham Post Entry Quarantine Facility, the quarantine facility for all animals and plants entering the country, which must be placed in quarantine according to Australian quarantine regulations.
The quarantine facility is located on Donnybrook Road, close to the Hume Freeway.

Gallery

See also
 Hume City Council - The current council for Mickleham.
 Shire of Bulla – Mickleham was previously within this former local government area.

References

External links

Towns in Victoria (Australia)
Suburbs of the City of Hume